Dunaújváros (also known by other alternative names) is an industrial city in Fejér County, Central Hungary. It is a city with county rights. Situated 70 kilometres (43 miles) south of Budapest on the Danube, the city is best known for its steelworks, which is the largest in the country.  It was built in the 1950s on the site of the former village of Dunapentele and was originally given the name of Sztálinváros before acquiring its current name in 1961.

Geography

Etymology and names
The city replaced the village of Dunapentele ("Pantaleon up on the Danube"), named after Saint Pantaleon. The construction of this new industrial city started in 1949 and the original village was renamed Sztálinváros ("Stalin City") in 1951. After the Hungarian revolution of 1956 the new government renamed the city the neutral Dunaújváros in 1961, which means "Danube New City" (New City on the Danube).

History

Dunaújváros is one of the newest cities in the country. It was built in the 1950s during the industrialization of the country under Socialist rule, as a new city next to an already existing village, Dunapentele.

Dunapentele
Dunapentele was not built on until the 1950s. The construction started on the Danube's right bank.
The area has been inhabited since ancient times. When Western Hungary was a Roman province under the name Pannonia, a military camp and a town called Intercisa stood in this place, at the border of the province. The Hungarians conquered the area in the early 10th century. The village of Pentele, named after the medieval Greek saint, Pantaleon, was founded shortly after.

Between 1541 and 1688 the village was under Ottoman rule, and during the 150-year war it was completely destroyed. During the freedom fight led by Prince Ferenc II Rákóczi of Transylvania, the place was deserted again. In the 18th century the village began to prosper. In 1830 the village was given the right to hold markets days twice a week. In 1831 there was a cholera epidemic and which caused a small scale peasants revolt. In 1833 Pentele was granted town status (oppidum) by Ferdinand V. The citizens took part in the freedom fight in 1848–49.

After the Second World War the new, Communist government started a major industrialisation programme, in support of its rearmament efforts. In  1949 Dunaújváros was chosen as the site of the largest iron and steel works in the country. The focus on steel production had the purpose of arming the socialist territories in fear of a third world war. With a strong steel industry they could quickly stock up on weaponry and machinery. Originally they were to be built close to Mohács, but the Hungarian-Yugoslavian relations worsened, and this new site was chosen, farther away from the Yugoslav border. The city was designed to have 25,000 residents.

The construction of the city began on May 2, 1950, near Dunapentele. Within one year more than 1,000 housing units were built and construction on the factory complex began. The city officially took the name of Joseph Stalin on April 4, 1952; its name was Sztálinváros 'Stalin City' as a parallel to Stalingrad in the USSR.

The metal works (formerly called: Dunai Vasmű, now ISD DUNAFERR) were opened in 1954. The city had a population of 27,772 at this time; 85% of them lived in nice, comfortable apartments, while about 4,200 people still lived in uncomfortable barracks which originally provided "homes" for the construction workers.

In the middle of the 1950s, public transport was organized, with buses carrying 24,000 passengers each day. During the 1950s many cultural and sports facilities were built, the Endre Ságvári Primary School being the largest school in Central Europe in the 1960s. The official and obligatory architectural style and art movement of the communist system was socialist realism. Per definition the style's meaning was communist, its form was national, and its preferred mode of representation was the allegory. There are several public statues and reliefs in the town, which represent the allegoric union of workers, peasants and intellectuals, surrounded by traditional folk motifs. Thanks to the inspiration of Bauhaus the buildings and monuments of this era (1949–56), like the forge, the cinema, the theatre, the hospital and the city's schools where characterized by a structural functionalism, but the ideological function resulted in classicist decorations, like columns, tympanums and arcades, because of which the informal name of the style became 'Stalin's Baroque'
.

In 1956, the construction was hindered by an earthquake and a flood, and in October by the start of the 1956 Hungarian Revolution. During the revolution the city used its historical name Dunapentele again. The Rákóczi radio station, which was created by the revolutionaries, broadcast from Dunapentele (in fact from a bus that was constantly moving around in the city so that it couldn't be located.) Even though the citizens of Dunapentele tried to defend their city, the Soviet army occupied the city on November 7, 1956. The city came under martial law and soviet tanks were stationed throughout the city.

After the revolution the city was still the "trademark city" of socialism in Hungary, and was presented as such to foreign visitors. Among the visitors were Yuri Gagarin and the Indonesian president Sukarno. The city also provided a scenic backdrop to popular movies.

In 1960, the ten-year-old city already had 31,000 residents who celebrated its anniversary.

On November 26, 1961, the city's name was changed to Dunaújváros (Duna|új|város meaning Danube-new-city; "New City upon Danube". See also Tiszaújváros) as a consequence of Stalin's death (1953) and the Hungarian Revolution (1956).

In 1990 it became a city with county rights—as one of the then four, (now five) cities in the country that have this status but are not county capitals—in accordance with a new law that granted this status to all cities with a population over 50,000. Even though the population of Dunaújváros has been under 50,000 since 2008, it has kept its status as a city with county rights (along with Hódmezővásárhely, which is in a similar situation).

The ISD DUNAFERR (formerly: Dunai Vasmű) factory complex is still is an important enterprise in the Hungarian steel industry, and a major employer (as of 2020, it has 4,500 employees) in the area.

Today, Dunaújváros is home to many new infrastructures (Pentele Bridge, direct M6-M8 highway link between Budapest and Dunaújváros), the new South Korean Hankook factory, Europe's biggest tire factory of Hankook, and Hamburger Hungaria, one of the largest containerboard manufacturers in Europe. This and other projects make Dunaújváros a new Hungarian boomtown.

Thanks to its formal political and economic importance, the communist urban design, the socialist realist architecture and its unique atmosphere the town is the considerable memento of communism. Many of the half-century-old buildings have received the protection of historic monuments, and the town is in the focus of growing touristic interest.

Demographics

In 2001 Dunaújváros had 55,309 residents (92.5% Hungarian, 0.6% Romani, 0.6% German, 6.3% other). Religions: 38.9% Roman Catholic, 8.3% Calvinist, 2% Lutheran, 37.8% Atheist, 0.2% other, 12.8% no answer.

Politics
The current mayor of Dunaújváros is Pintér Tamás (Jobbik).

The local Municipal Assembly, elected at the 2019 local government elections, is made up of 15 members (1 Mayor, 10 Individual constituencies MEPs and 4 Compensation List MEPs) divided into this political parties and alliances:

Sport
The most popular sport is ice hockey, and the city is home to the Steel Bulls. The second most popular sport in the town is football. The town has one team playing in the top-level league, the Nemzeti Bajnokság I, the Dunaújváros PASE. However the most well-known team is the defunct Dunaújváros FC which also won the 1999–2000 Nemzeti Bajnokság I season. The women's water polo team of Dunaújvárosi FVE won the 2018 edition of the LEN Trophy.

Notable people
 

Károly Bezdek (born 1955), professor of mathematics
Fruzsina Brávik (born 1986), 2008 Olympian in water polo
Anita Bulath (born 1983), handball player
Csanád Erdély (born 1996), ice hockey player
 (born 1988), ice hockey player
Viktor Horváth (born 1978), Modern Pentathlete
Miklós Kiss (born 1981), designer and visual artist
Zsófia Kovács (born 2000), gymnast
Balázs Ladányi (born 1976), ice hockey player
Bálint Magosi (born 1989), ice hockey player
Gergő Nagy (born 1989), ice hockey player
Imre Peterdi (born 1980), ice hockey player
Miklós Rajna (born 1991), ice hockey player
Viktor Szélig (born 1975), ice hockey player
Viktor Tokaji (born 1977), ice hockey player
Georgina Toth (born 1982), Hungarian–Cameroonian hammer thrower
János Vas (born 1983), ice hockey player
Márton Vas (born 1980), ice hockey player

Twin towns – sister cities

Dunaújváros is twinned with:

 Alchevsk, Ukraine
 Elbasan, Albania
 Giurgiu, Romania
 İnegöl, Turkey

 Silistra, Bulgaria
 Sremska Mitrovica, Serbia
 Terni, Italy
 Villejuif, France

See also
Dunaújváros Power Plant
Tiszaújváros

References

Notes

External links

 in Hungarian
Dunaújváros 2400 (detailed history, Hungarian only, with many pictures)
Portal site (Hungarian only)
Video news portal (Hungarian only)
Statue park
Bridge in Dunaújváros
Aerial photography: Dunaújváros
The city features prominently in the film The Ister. Official site

 
Socialist planned cities
Populated places in Fejér County
Populated places established in 1951
Populated places on the Danube
Cities with county rights of Hungary
Planned cities in Hungary
Roman settlements in Hungary
Serb communities in Hungary
De-Stalinization